The Portuguese escudo was the currency of Portugal from May 22, 1911, until the introduction of the euro on January 1, 2002. The escudo was subdivided into 100 . The word  derives from the scutum shield.

Because of the conversion rate of 1,000  = , three decimal places were initially used ( = ).

History
The currency replaced by the escudo in 1911 was denominated in Portuguese reals and  worth 1,000 . The  was equivalent to 2.0539 grams fine gold from 1688 to 1800, and 1.62585 g from 1854 to 1891.

The escudo (gold) was again introduced on 22 May 1911, after the 1910 Republican revolution, to replace the real at the rate of 1,000  to 1 . The term  (thousand ) remained a colloquial synonym of  up to the 1990s. One million  was called one , or simply one . This expression passed on to the escudo, meaning .

The escudo's value was initially set at  = 1 kg of gold.

During World War II, escudos were heavily sought after by Nazi Germany, through Swiss banks, as foreign currency to make purchases to Portugal and other neutral nations.

Territorial usage
The escudo was used in the Portuguese mainland, the Azores and Madeira, with no distinction of coins or banknotes.
 Angolan escudo
 Cape Verdean escudo
 Mozambican escudo
 Portuguese Guinean escudo
 São Tomé and Príncipe escudo
Of the above, only Cape Verde continues to use the escudo.

In Macau, the currency during the colonial period was, as it is today, the Macanese pataca.

Timor-Leste adopted the Portuguese Timorese escudo whilst still a Portuguese colony, having earlier used the Portuguese Timor pataca.

Portuguese India adopted the Portuguese Indian escudo for a brief time between 1958 and 1961 before Goa became a part of India; prior to that, it used the Portuguese Indian rupia.

Coins

The mintage period for the various denominations of the gold escudo (worth 1.6  or ) introduced in 1722 was different:  escudo through 1821, 2 escudos through 1789, and 4 escudos through 1799. The eight-escudo coin was only struck between 1722 and 1730.

Aluminium bronze was replaced with cupro-nickel in 1927.

In 1986, a new coinage was introduced which circulated until replacement by the euro.

Coins in circulation at the time of the changeover to the euro were:
  (0.50 cent)
  (2.49 cents)
  (4.99 cents)
  (9.98 cents)
  (24.94 cents)
  (49.88 cents)
  (99.76 cents)
Coins ceased to be exchangeable for euros on December 31, 2002.

Long after the  coins disappeared, people still called the  coins  ("five crowns").

Also, people still referred to escudos at the time of the changeover in multiples of the older currency  (plural ). Many people called the  coins  (two and five-hundreds), referring to the correspondence  = 2500 .

Banknotes

The last  and  notes were printed dated 1978 and 1980, respectively, with  notes being replaced by coins in 1989, the same year that the  note was introduced.

Banknotes in circulation at the time of the changeover to the euro were:
  (€2.49)
  (€4.99)
  (€9.98)
  (€24.94)
  (€49.88)

The last series of escudo banknotes could be returned to the central bank  and converted to euros until 28 February 2022.

Escudo banknotes celebrated notable figures from the history of Portugal.

The last  banknote depicted , the famous Portuguese writer and poet.

Colloquial expressions

 was the unofficial multiple of the escudo: 1  meant , 2  meant  and so on. Since the escudo was worth 1,000  (the older currency), therefore one  was the same as a thousand escudos. The expression remained in usage after the advent of the euro, albeit less often, meaning €5, roughly worth .

Occasionally , literally meaning 'sticks', was also used to refer to the escudo ("" – 'Do you have 1,000 escudos/sticks?').

See also
 Portuguese euro coins
 Economy of Portugal
 Economic history of Portugal

References

Sources

External links
 Overview of the Portuguese escudo from the BBC
 Portuguese escudo coins
 Historical banknotes from Portugal 

 1999 by law, 2002 de facto.

Modern obsolete currencies
Currencies replaced by the euro
Currencies of Europe
Escudo
Escudo
Escudo
Escudo